Actinella is a genus of land snails in the family Geomitridae.

Species
Species include:
 Actinella actinophora (R. T. Lowe, 1831)
 † Actinella arcinella (R. T. Lowe, 1855) 
 Actinella arcta (R. T. Lowe, 1831)
 Actinella armitageana (R. T. Lowe, 1852)
 Actinella arridens  (R. T. Lowe, 1831)
 Actinella carinofausta  Waldén, 1983
 † Actinella crassiuscula (Cockerell, 1922) 
 † Actinella descendens (Wollaston, 1878) 
 Actinella fausta  (R. T. Lowe, 1831)
 † Actinella fecundaerrata Groh & Cameron, 2019 
 Actinella laciniosa  (R. T. Lowe, 1852)
 Actinella lentiginosa  (R. T. Lowe, 1831)
 † Actinella morenensis Seddon, 1990 
 Actinella obserata  (R. T. Lowe, 1852)
 † Actinella papillosculpta Waldén, 1983 
 † Actinella promontoriensis Waldén, 1983 
 Actinella robusta (Wollaston, 1878)
Synonyms
 Actinella anaglyptica (Reeve, 1852): synonym of Plebecula anaglyptica (Reeve, 1852) (superseded generic combination)
 Actinella giramica R. T. Lowe, 1852) : synonym of Plebecula giramica (R. T. Lowe, 1852) (superseded combination)
 Actinella littorinella (J. Mabille, 1883): synonym of Domunculifex littorinella (Mabille, 1883) (superseded generic combination)
 Actinella nitidiuscula (G. B. Sowerby I, 1824): synonym of Plebecula nitidiuscula (G. B. Sowerby I, 1824) (superseded combination)
 † Actinella saxipotens (Wollaston, 1878): synonym of † Plebecula saxipotens (Wollaston, 1878) (superseded combination)

References

 Bank, R. A. (2017). Classification of the Recent terrestrial Gastropoda of the World. Last update: July 16th, 2017

External links
 Lowe, R. T. (1852). Brief diagnostic notices of new Maderan land shells. The Annals and Magazine of Natural History. (2) 9 (50): 112-120; (2) 9 (52): 275-279. London

 
Geomitridae
Taxonomy articles created by Polbot